GHV may refer to:
 gamma-Hydroxyvaleric acid
 Gross heating value
 Growth hormone variant
 Guild Home Video